Insheim is a municipality in the Verbandsgemeinde Herxheim in the Südliche Weinstraße district in Rhineland-Palatinate.

Geography
Insheim is a part of the Südpfalz. The township belongs to the Verbandsgemeinde Herxheim. Next to Insheim are - clockwise - Landau in der Pfalz, Herxheim bei Landau/Pfalz, Erlenbach bei Kandel, Steinweiler, Rohrbach (Pfalz) and Impflingen.

References

External links
 www.insheim.de

Südliche Weinstraße